Clara Mamet (born September 29, 1994) is an American actress and musician best known for her role as Amber Weaver in the ABC television comedy The Neighbors.

Early life 
Mamet was born in Randolph, Vermont, the daughter of playwright David Mamet and actress Rebecca Pidgeon, and is the half-sister of actress Zosia Mamet. She has a brother, Noah. Her father was born to a Jewish family and her mother converted to Judaism.

Career 
Mamet became legally emancipated at 15 so she could leave high school at 16 to pursue her career to become a playwright and actress. She started auditioning for acting parts when she was 14, but "nobody had ever hired me before. So I thought I'd hire myself" by writing roles. Mamet wrote, directed and starred in her first film, Two-Bit Waltz (2014), a semi-autobiographical movie with William H. Macy, her mother Rebecca Pidgeon, and Jared Gilman. Mamet has also written plays, Paris and The Solvit Kids, the latter co-written with Jack Quaid.

In September 2015, it was revealed Mamet had been cast in Neighbors 2: Sorority Rising.  Since then, she has had other roles.

Filmography

Film

Television

Works or publications 
 Mamet, Clara. Paris. New York: Samuel French, 2012.  
 Mamet, Clara, and Jack Quaid. The Solvit Kids. New York: Samuel French, 2012.

References

External links 
 
 

1994 births
Living people
American stage actresses
American television actresses
American film actresses
Jewish American actresses
21st-century American actresses
People from Randolph, Vermont
Actresses from Vermont
21st-century American Jews